Archelaus was the half-brother of Philip II, king of ancient Macedonia. He was the son of Amyntas III and his second wife, Gygaea. Philip executed Archelaus shortly after he became king in 359 BC, possibly due to the military threat posed by the pretender Argaeus and the need to secure the throne from additional potential rivals. He also likely executed Gygaea's other sons, Menelaus and Arrhidaeus, following a siege at Olynthus ten years later in 348 BC.

References

See also 
List of ancient Macedonians

4th-century BC Macedonians
People who died under the reign of Philip II of Macedon
Murdered royalty of Macedonia (ancient kingdom)
359 BC deaths
Year of birth unknown